A list of films produced in Hong Kong in 1965:.

1965

References

External links
 IMDB list of Hong Kong films
 Hong Kong films of 1965 at HKcinemamagic.com

1965
Hong Kong
Films